Qinlingosaurus is a genus of herbivorous sauropod dinosaur from the Late Cretaceous of Asia.

The type species, Qinlingosaurus luonanensis, was named by Xue Xiangxu, Zhang Yunxiang and Bi Xianwu in 1996. The generic name comes from the Qinling mountain range of Shaanxi Province in China, where the first fossils were recovered at Hongtuling. The specific name refers to the provenance near Luonang.

The holotype, NWUV 1112, was found in a layer of the Hongtuling Formation or Shanyang Formation, perhaps dating from the Maastrichtian. It consists of an ilium, ischium and three vertebrae. The ilium has a length of seventy-seven centimetres and is elongated with a convex upper profile. Its anterior process is relatively long. The pubic process is long, the ischial process short.

In view of the limited fossil evidence, it is classified as Sauropoda incertae sedis. It probably represents a member of the Neosauropoda. Given its temporal range it may be a titanosaur.

References

Late Cretaceous dinosaurs of Asia
Sauropods
Fossil taxa described in 1996